Corophium arenarium is a small (up to ) European amphipod crustacean of the family Corophiidae. It looks very similar to C. volutator.

Corophium arenarium originates from the coasts of France and the North Sea.

External links
 M.J. de Kluijver & S.S. Ingalsuo Corophium arenarium Macrobenthos of the North Sea - Crustacea. Marine Species Identification Portal

Corophiidea
Crustaceans described in 1937